Federal Medical Centre Owo is a public health care centre located in Owo, a city in Ondo State, southwestern Nigeria.

References

Hospitals in Nigeria
Owo